Farstorp is a locality village situated in Hässleholm Municipality, Skåne County, Sweden with 704 inhabitants in 2012.

The well-preserved medieval Farstorp Church lies in the village.

References  

Populated places in Skåne County